Manikaran is located in the Parvati Valley on river Parvati, northeast of Bhuntar in the Kullu District of Himachal Pradesh. It is at an altitude of 1760 m and is located 4 km from Kasol, about 45 km from Kullu and about 35 km from Bhuntar.

This small town attracts tourists visiting the hot springs and pilgrim centres of Manali and Kullu. An experimental geothermal energy plant has also been set up here.

Religious centre

Manikaran is a pilgrimage centre for Hindus and Sikhs. The Hindus believe that Manu recreated human life in Manikaran after the flood, making it a sacred area. It has many temples and a Gurudwara. 
There are temples of the Hindu deities Rama, Krishna, and Vishnu. The area is well known for its hot springs and its beautiful landscape.

According to legend, when the Hindu God Shiva and his consort Parvati were walking in the valley, Parvati dropped one of her earrings. The jewel was seized by Shesha, the serpent deity, who then disappeared into the earth with it. Shesha only surrendered the jewel when Shiva performed the cosmic dance, the Tandava and shot the jewel up through the water. Apparently, jewels continued to be thrown up in the waters at Manikaran until the 1905 Kangra earthquake.

Sikh belief

 

According to the Sikhs, during third Udasi, the founder of Sikhism Guru Nanak came to this place in 15 Asu 1574 Bikrami with his disciple Bhai Mardana. Mardana felt hungry and they had no food. Guru Nanak sent Mardana to collect food for the langar (the community kitchen). Many people donated atta (flour) to make roti (bread). The one problem was that there was no fire to cook the food. Guru Nanak asked Mardana to lift a stone and he complied and a hot spring appeared. As directed by Guru Nanak, Mardana put the rolled chapatis in the spring, but to his despair, the chapatis sank. Guru Nanak then told him to pray to God saying that if his chapatis float back then he would donate one chapati in His name. When he prayed all the chapatis started floating up duly baked. Guru Nanak said that when anyone who donates in the name of God, his drowned items float back.

Hindu belief

The legend of Manikaran says that while walking around, Lord Shiva and Goddess Parvati once chanced upon a lush green place surrounded by mountains. Enamoured by the beauty of the place, they decided to spend some time there. It is believed that they actually spent eleven hundred years here.

During their stay, Goddess Parvati lost her mani (precious stones) in the waters of a stream. Upset over the loss, she asked Shiva to retrieve it. Lord Shiva commanded his attendant to find the mani for Parvati. However, when they failed, he was extremely angry. He opened his third eye, a tremendously inauspicious event which led to disturbances in the universe. An appeal was made before the serpent god, Sheshnag, to pacify Lord Shiva. Sheshnag hissed, thereby giving rise to a flow of boiling water. The water spread over the entire area, resulting in the emergence of precious stones of the type Goddess Parvati had lost, and Lord Shiva and Goddess Parvati were happy.

The name Manikaran is derived from this legend. The water is still hot and is considered extremely auspicious. A pilgrimage to this place is thought of as complete. It is also believed that there is no need to pay a visit to Kashi after visiting this place. The water of the spring is also supposed to have curative powers. The water is so hot that rice can be cooked in it.

Hindu temples at Manikaran

Lord Ram Chandra Ji Temple
History

The temple was constructed by Raja Jagat Singh in the 15th century.

It is at an altitude of 1756 m and is located about 35 km from Kullu.

It is claimed that even before 1905, these hot water springs, sprang with full force. Making an 11 to 14 feet high fountain. The temperature of different springs at Manikaran is 64 to 80 °C . There is no sulphur in these springs.

Food is cooked in these springs.
Bathing here is considered a balm for arthritis.

Temple of Lord Shiva
However, an earthquake in 1905 caused damage to the temple and it was slightly tilted. The importance of Manikaran is also judged from the fact that devas of Kullu valley pay regular visit to this place on specified dates.

References

External links

 MANIKARAN
 Manikaran Gurudwara at TripAdvisor

Hindu temples in Himachal Pradesh
Kullu
Buildings and structures in Kullu district
Hot springs of India